British English (BrE, en-GB, or BE) is, according to Oxford Dictionaries, "English as used in Great Britain, as distinct from that used elsewhere". More narrowly, it can refer specifically to the English language in England, or, more broadly, to the collective dialects of English throughout the British Isles taken as a single umbrella variety, for instance additionally incorporating Scottish English, Welsh English, and Northern Irish English. Tom McArthur in the Oxford Guide to World English acknowledges that British English shares "all the ambiguities and tensions [with] the word 'British' and as a result can be used and interpreted in two ways, more broadly or more narrowly, within a range of blurring and ambiguity".

Variations exist in formal (both written and spoken) English in the United Kingdom. For example, the adjective wee is almost exclusively used in parts of Scotland, North East England, Northern Ireland, Ireland, and occasionally Yorkshire, whereas the adjective little is predominant elsewhere. Nevertheless, there is a meaningful degree of uniformity in written English within the United Kingdom, and this could be described by the term British English.  The forms of spoken English, however, vary considerably more than in most other areas of the world where English is spoken and so a uniform concept of British English is more difficult to apply to the spoken language. 

Globally, countries that are former British colonies and members of the Commonwealth tend to follow British English, as is the case for English used within the European Union. In China both British English and American English are taught. The UK government proactively teaches and promotes English around the world and operates in over 200 countries.

History 

English is a West Germanic language that originated from the Anglo-Frisian dialects brought to Britain by Germanic settlers from various parts of what is now northwest Germany and the northern Netherlands. The resident population at this time was generally speaking Common Brittonic—the insular variety of Continental Celtic, which was influenced by the Roman occupation. This group of languages (Welsh, Cornish, Cumbric) cohabited alongside English into the modern period, but due to their remoteness from the Germanic languages, influence on English was notably limited. However, the degree of influence remains debated, and it has recently been argued that its grammatical influence accounts for the substantial innovations noted between English and the other West Germanic languages.

Initially, Old English was a diverse group of dialects, reflecting the varied origins of the Anglo-Saxon Kingdoms of England. One of these dialects, Late West Saxon, eventually came to dominate. The original Old English language was then influenced by two waves of invasion: the first was by speakers of the Scandinavian branch of the Germanic family, who settled in parts of Britain in the eighth and ninth centuries; the second was the Normans in the 11th century, who spoke Old Norman and ultimately developed an English variety of this called Anglo-Norman. These two invasions caused English to become "mixed" to some degree (though it was never a truly mixed language in the strictest sense of the word; mixed languages arise from the cohabitation of speakers of different languages, who develop a hybrid tongue for basic communication).

The more idiomatic, concrete and descriptive English is, the more it is from Anglo-Saxon origins. The more intellectual and abstract English is, the more it contains Latin and French influences, e.g. swine (like the Germanic ) is the animal in the field bred by the occupied Anglo-Saxons and pork (like the French ) is the animal at the table eaten by the occupying Normans. Another example is the Anglo-Saxon  meaning cow, and the French  meaning beef.

Cohabitation with the Scandinavians resulted in a significant grammatical simplification and lexical enrichment of the Anglo-Frisian core of English; the later Norman occupation led to the grafting onto that Germanic core of a more elaborate layer of words from the Romance branch of the European languages. This Norman influence entered English largely through the courts and government. Thus, English developed into a "borrowing" language of great flexibility and with a huge vocabulary.

Dialects 

Dialects and accents vary amongst the four countries of the United Kingdom, as well as within the countries themselves.

The major divisions are normally classified as English English (or English as spoken in England, which encompasses Southern English, West Country, East and West Midlands English and Northern English dialects), Ulster English (in Northern Ireland), Welsh English (not to be confused with the Welsh language), and Scottish English (not to be confused with the Scots language or Scottish Gaelic language). The various British dialects also differ in the words that they have borrowed from other languages.

Around the middle of the 15th century, there were points where within the 5 major dialects there were almost 500 ways to spell the word though.

Research 
Following its last major survey of English Dialects (1949–1950), the University of Leeds has started work on a new project. In May 2007 the Arts and Humanities Research Council awarded a grant to Leeds to study British regional dialects.

The team are sifting through a large collection of examples of regional slang words and phrases turned up by the "Voices project" run by the BBC, in which they invited the public to send in examples of English still spoken throughout the country. The BBC Voices project also collected hundreds of news articles about how the British speak English from swearing through to items on language schools. This information will also be collated and analysed by Johnson's team both for content and for where it was reported. "Perhaps the most remarkable finding in the Voices study is that the English language is as diverse as ever, despite our increased mobility and constant exposure to other accents and dialects through TV and radio". When discussing the award of the grant in 2007, Leeds University stated:

English regional 
Most people in Britain speak with a regional accent or dialect. However, about 2% of Britons speak with an accent called Received Pronunciation (also called "the Queen's English", "Oxford English"  and "BBC English"), that is essentially region-less. It derives from a mixture of the Midlands and Southern dialects spoken in London in the early modern period. It is frequently used as a model for teaching English to foreign learners.

In the South East there are significantly different accents; the Cockney accent spoken by some East Londoners is strikingly different from Received Pronunciation (RP). Cockney rhyming slang can be (and was initially intended to be) difficult for outsiders to understand, although the extent of its use is often somewhat exaggerated.

Londoners speak with a mixture of accents, depending on ethnicity, neighbourhood, class, age, upbringing, and sundry other factors. Estuary English has been gaining prominence in recent decades: it has some features of RP and some of Cockney. Immigrants to the UK in recent decades have brought many more languages to the country and particularly to London. Surveys started in 1979 by the Inner London Education Authority discovered over 125 languages being spoken domestically by the families of the inner city's schoolchildren. Notably Multicultural London English, a sociolect that emerged in the late 20th century spoken mainly by young, working-class people in multicultural parts of London.

Since the mass internal migration to Northamptonshire in the 1940s and given its position between several major accent regions, it has become a source of various accent developments. In Northampton the older accent has been influenced by overspill Londoners. There is an accent known locally as the Kettering accent, which is a transitional accent between the East Midlands and East Anglian. It is the last southern Midlands accent to use the broad "a" in words like bath or grass (i.e.  or ). Conversely crass or plastic use a slender "a". A few miles northwest in Leicestershire the slender "a" becomes more widespread generally.

Features 
Phonological features characteristic of British English revolve around the pronunciation of the letter R, as well as the dental plosive T and some diphthongs specific to this dialect.

T-stopping 
Once regarded as a Cockney feature, in a number of forms of spoken British English,  has become commonly realised as a glottal stop  when it is in the intervocalic position, in a process called T-glottalisation. National media, being based in London, have seen the glottal stop spreading more widely than it once was in word endings, not being heard as "no" and bottle of water being heard as "bole of waer". It is still stigmatised when used at the beginning and central positions, such as later, while often has all but regained . Other consonants subject to this usage in Cockney English are p, as in paer and k as in baer.

R-dropping 
In most areas of England and Wales, outside the West Country and other near-by counties of the UK, the consonant R is not pronounced if not followed by a vowel, lengthening the preceding vowel instead. This phenomenon is known as non-rhoticity.
In these same areas, a tendency exists to insert an R between a word ending in a vowel and a next word beginning with a vowel. This is called the intrusive R. It could be understood as a merger, in that words that once ended in an R and words that did not are no longer treated differently. This is also due to London-centric influences. Examples of R-dropping are car and sugar, where the R is not pronounced.

Diphthongisation 
British dialects differ on the extent of diphthongisation of long vowels, with southern varieties extensively turning them into diphthongs, and with northern dialects normally preserving many of them. As a comparison, North American varieties could be said to be in-between.

North 
Long vowels /iː/ and /uː/ are usually preserved, and in several areas also /oː/ and /eː/, as in go and say (unlike other varieties of English, that change them to [oʊ] and [eɪ] respectively). Some areas go as far as not diphthongising medieval /iː/ and /uː/, that give rise to modern /aɪ/ and /aʊ/; that is, for example, in the traditional accent of Newcastle upon Tyne, 'out' will sound as 'oot', and in parts of Scotland and North-West England, 'my' will be pronounced as 'me'.

South 
Long vowels /iː/ and /uː/ are diphthongised to [ɪi] and [ʊu] respectively (or, more technically, [ʏʉ], with a raised tongue), so that ee and oo in feed and food are pronounced with a movement. The diphthong [oʊ] is also pronounced with a greater movement, normally [əʊ], [əʉ] or [əɨ].

People in groups 
Dropping a morphological grammatical number, in collective nouns, is stronger in British English than North American English. This is to treat them as plural when once grammatically singular, a perceived natural number prevails, especially when applying to institutional nouns and groups of people.

The noun 'police', for example, undergoes this treatment:

A football team can be treated likewise:

This tendency can be observed in texts produced already in the 19th century. For example, Jane Austen, a British author, writes in Chapter 4 of Pride and Prejudice, published in 1813: However, in Chapter 16, the grammatical number is used.

Negatives 
Some dialects of British English use negative concords, also known as double negatives. Rather than changing a word or using a positive, words like nobody, not, nothing, and never would be used in the same sentence. While this does not occur in Standard English, it does occur in non-standard dialects. The double negation follows the idea of two different morphemes, one that causes the double negation, and one that is used for the point or the verb.

Standardisation 
As with English around the world, the English language as used in the United Kingdom is governed by convention rather than formal code: there is no body equivalent to the Académie française or the Real Academia Española. Dictionaries (for example, the Oxford English Dictionary, the Longman Dictionary of Contemporary English, the Chambers Dictionary, and the Collins Dictionary) record usage rather than attempting to prescribe it. In addition, vocabulary and usage change with time: words are freely borrowed from other languages and other strains of English, and neologisms are frequent.

For historical reasons dating back to the rise of London in the ninth century, the form of language spoken in London and the East Midlands became standard English within the Court, and ultimately became the basis for generally accepted use in the law, government, literature and education in Britain. The standardisation of British English is thought to be from both dialect levelling and a thought of social superiority. Speaking in the Standard dialect created class distinctions; those who did not speak the standard English would be considered of a lesser class or social status and often discounted or considered of a low intelligence. Another contribution to the standardisation of British English was the introduction of the printing press to England in the mid-15th century. In doing so, William Caxton enabled a common language and spelling to be dispersed among the entirety of England at a much faster rate.

Samuel Johnson's A Dictionary of the English Language (1755) was a large step in the English-language spelling reform, where the purification of language focused on standardising both speech and spelling. By the early 20th century, British authors had produced numerous books intended as guides to English grammar and usage, a few of which achieved sufficient acclaim to have remained in print for long periods and to have been reissued in new editions after some decades. These include, most notably of all, Fowler's Modern English Usage and The Complete Plain Words by Sir Ernest Gowers.

Detailed guidance on many aspects of writing British English for publication is included in style guides issued by various publishers including The Times newspaper, the Oxford University Press and the Cambridge University Press. The Oxford University Press guidelines were originally drafted as a single broadsheet page by Horace Henry Hart, and were at the time (1893) the first guide of their type in English; they were gradually expanded and eventually published, first as Hart's Rules, and in 2002 as part of The Oxford Manual of Style. Comparable in authority and stature to The Chicago Manual of Style for published American English, the Oxford Manual is a fairly exhaustive standard for published British English that writers can turn to in the absence of specific guidance from their publishing house.

Relationship with Commonwealth English 
British English is the basis of, and very similar to Commonwealth English. Commonwealth English is English spoken and written in Commonwealth countries, though often with some local variation. This includes English spoken in Australia, Malta, New Zealand, Nigeria, and South Africa. It also includes South Asian English used in South Asia, in English varieties in Southeast Asia, and in parts of Africa. Canadian English is based on British English, but has more influence from American English. British English, for example, is the closest English to Indian English, but Indian English has extra vocabulary and some English words are assigned different meanings.

See also 

 American English
 American and British English spelling differences
 Australian English
 British Sign Language
 Canadian English
 Commonwealth English
 Hiberno-English
 Newfoundland English
 New Zealand English
 South African English

References

Notes

Citations

Bibliography 
 McArthur, Tom (2002). Oxford Guide to World English. Oxford: Oxford University Press.  hardback,  paperback.
 Bragg, Melvyn (2004). The Adventure of English, London: Sceptre. 
 Peters, Pam (2004). The Cambridge Guide to English Usage. Cambridge: Cambridge University Press. .
 Simpson, John (ed.) (1989). Oxford English Dictionary, 2nd edition. Oxford: Oxford University Press.

External links 

 Sounds Familiar? Examples of regional accents and dialects across the UK on the British Library's 'Sounds Familiar' website
 Accents and dialects from the British Library Sound Archive
 Accents of English from Around the World  Hear and compare how the same 110 words are pronounced in 50 English accents from around the world – instantaneous playback online
 The Septic's Companion: A British Slang Dictionary an online dictionary of British slang, viewable alphabetically or by category
 British English Turkey

 
Dialects of English
Languages of Gibraltar
Languages of the United Kingdom